Luiz Gustavo Domingues (born 28 September 1988), commonly known as Domingues, is a Brazilian professional footballer who plays as a centre-back for Greek Super League 2 club Apollon Smyrnis.

References

1988 births
Living people
Brazilian footballers
Oeste Futebol Clube players
Clube Atlético Penapolense players
Clube Atlético Bragantino players
Botafogo Futebol Clube (SP) players
Joinville Esporte Clube players
Grêmio Novorizontino players
Paysandu Sport Club players
Esporte Clube Juventude players
Associação Desportiva São Caetano players
Panionios F.C. players
Apollon Smyrnis F.C. players
Association football defenders
Campeonato Brasileiro Série A players
Campeonato Brasileiro Série B players
Campeonato Brasileiro Série D players
Super League Greece players
Brazilian expatriate footballers
Expatriate footballers in Greece
Brazilian expatriate sportspeople in Greece